Prentice Airport  is a public use airport located one nautical mile (2 km) east of the central business district of Prentice, a village in the town of Prentice, Price County, Wisconsin, United States. It is owned by the village of Prentice.

Facilities and aircraft 
Prentice Airport covers an area of 28 acres (11 ha) at an elevation of 1,578 feet (481 m) above mean sea level. It has one runway designated 9/27 with an asphalt surface measuring 3,134 by 60 feet (955 x 18 m).

For the 12-month period ending August 19, 2020, the airport had 1,520 aircraft operations, an average of 127 per month: 99% general aviation and 1% air taxi.  
In February 2023, there were no aircraft based at this airport.

See also 
 List of airports in Wisconsin

References

External links 
 Airport page at Village of Prentice website
 Prentice (5U2) at Wisconsin DOT airport directory

Airports in Wisconsin
Transportation in Price County, Wisconsin
Buildings and structures in Price County, Wisconsin